The Bozeman Watch Company of Bozeman, Montana, was an American company that designed and engineered its own timepieces and had its mechanical components certified by the Contrôle officiel suisse des Chronomètres (COSC) certified timepieces. The company went out of business in 2015.

History
Christopher F. Wardle, originally a native of Michigan, sought out an industrial designer to help put his vision and original watch designs to paper. Having been a collector of many American brands and having the desire to keep the models reminiscent of the mid 20th century styles, Wardle started to clinch concepts into designs and in 2005 introduced the first timepiece, the Smokejumper Chronograph. The company opened its first exclusive showroom in Bozeman, Montana, the same year. In 2008, the company expanded its Michigan design staff and started expanding its ability to create original engineering data, tooling, and suppliers to ramp up its model lineup for its expanded showroom plans. In 2010, the Bozeman Watch Company opened another dealer in Whitefish, Montana and Jackson Hole, WY in 2011.

Staying away from standard production parts, the company claimed that it was taking up to 3 years to design and take to market any of its watch models. "Where many watch makers buy out of catalogs, BWC uses tiny parts that are made for their company exclusively".

Watch Models

Yellowstone
The ladies' Yellowstone watch has a 32mm case diameter, interlaced with sapphire crystals. It is waterproof to 5 ATM or about 165 ft. It has a 21 jewel automatic mechanical movement with a date function and a sweep second hand. A hundred pieces was expected to be produced in 2011 and estimated to be available for purchase in December 2011. A men's 38mm model was expected to be released simultaneously with the ladies' model. The men's model was planned to house a 25 jewel automatic movement. It was available in stainless steel or alligator black wristband.

B1 Hellcat
This watch was offering two straps, a tan or black saddle leather strap and a stainless steel bracelet. This watch was planned to be released with two hundred first editions. It has a 42.6 mm diameter watch face, a 13.2 mm height. It also has a 25-jewel Swiss movement, 28,800 VPH, a sweep second hand and date functions as well as a screw-down crown. It is water resistant to 330 ft.

Snowmaster Telemetric
This watch has 43mm stainless steel case with 25 jewel automatic Swiss Valjoux movement. Each movement is independently COSC certified in Geneva with second, minute and hour Chronograph timing functions. It also comes with a second 24-hour time zone complication or GMT function as well as a speed and distance telemetric scale.

Smokejumper GMT and Smokejumper Chronograph
There are two Smokejumper style watches, the Smokejumper GMT or Chronograph. The GMT Worldtime is the National Smokejumpers official timepiece. It comes with two different available dial colors: silver and black or enamel and super luminescent. The GMT has automatic Swiss specialty-line mechanical movement, a 21-jewel movement with 28,800 vibrations per hour (VPH). It has a 42-hour power reserve and a second time zone function. It is COSC certified, is water resistant to 330 ft and is domed with sapphire crystals. The back is engraved with the Missoula, MT smokejumper base logo endorsement. The GMT will initially be limited to one hundred individual numbered pieces. The original Smokejumper Chronograph, as stated in the April 2008 issue of Insync; "[I]s BWC's only chronograph and at 46.5mm, its largest. It is also limited to 100 individually numbered editions, which are nearly all spoken for. Wardle says once the Smokejumper is sold out they will produce a different model,[GMT] which should please owners of this distinctive piece".

Herradura
The Herradura was developed with direction from two-time World Series winner, Bosten Red Sox pitcher Josh Beckett. Beckett's signature was sent to the BWC, so that each of the 53 numbered pieces have the pitcher's mark on it. The Herradura has 24 jewels with 28,800 VPH, a sweep second hand with a three o'clock date window. It is COSC certified with raised Arabic numerals and raised gold markers with luminescence. It is water resistant to 330 ft and comes with a 44 mm stainless steel case. The leather strap, which is available in saddle tan, is handmade.

Sidewinder
The Sidewinder Retrograde was introduced as a part of its "Montana Class Watch Collection".  It is made in the style of a 19th-century timepiece, with raised and separate dial accents. The watch is limited to 100 silver dial and 50 black dial references, with each piece individually numbered. They each have a power reserve meter sub dial, a sweep second hand and a three o'clock date marker, and are all COSC certified. They are water resistant to 330 ft and have convex sapphire crystal dome and come with a 44 mm stainless steel case.

USS Montana
The USS Montana has modified Val Granges automatic caliber, with 24 jewels and 28,800 VPH. It is COSC certified with sweep second hand and raised blue Roman numerals. It is water resistant up to 330 ft and comes with 44 mm stainless steel case. The USS Montana has a convex sapphire crystal and tiered lugs.

2nd Edition Cutthroats
The 2nd edition Cutthroat watch has been made with the addition of 24-hour time zone or GMT function. There are 5 versions of the Cutthroat. Swiss automatic caliber (movement), 21 jewels with 28,800 VPH, sweep second hand and date function, 24-hour 2nd time zone on outer dial, COSC certified, individually placed, raised luminescent hour markers, water resistance to 10 ATM below sea level, 42 mm stainless steel case and only 10.5 mm in height, and convex (domed) sapphire crystal.

Schofield
Limited to a 2010 production of 10 Silver dial individually numbered pieces and with 24 jewels with 28,800 vibrations per hour, the Schofield timepiece is 44 mm stainless steel case with sweep second hand and 3 o'clock date window. It has individually placed stainless Roman Numerals and raised luminescent 3,6,9,12 hour markers. It comes in a silver or black dial. It comes in Caiman handmade crocodile strap, available in brown or black, handmade Louisiana alligator strap, available in brown or black, or handmade Montana saddle leather strap available in tan or black. All of them have deployment buckles.

References

External links
 

American companies established in 2001
Manufacturing companies established in 2001
American companies disestablished in 2015
Manufacturing companies disestablished in 2015
Privately held companies based in Montana
Watch manufacturing companies of the United States
2001 establishments in Montana
Defunct manufacturing companies based in Montana